is a Japanese former actor. He was a member of the acting group D-Boys. Yanagishita joined the unit D-Date (D☆DATE) of the same agency as a new member. It was announced at the last performance of the live tour in Tokyo Dome City Hall on June 29, 2012.

Biography
In 2006, Yanagishita won the Watanabe Entertainments 3rd official D-Boys audition with the Grand Prix and became an official member of the group. In Winter of the same year, Yanagishita won the role of Kaoru Kaidoh, the viper-like 2nd year regular of Seigaku Middle School's tennis club, in the Prince of Tennis musical series, Tenimyu, as part of the third generation Seigaku cast. Prior to his casting, Kousuke Kujirai, who had played the role before him with the second Seigaku cast, had filled in as Kaidoh with the third cast due to actor Takahiro Tasaki's withdrawal from the show. Yanagishita debuted as Kaidoh in the Absolute King Rikkai feat. Rokkaku ~ First Service musical on December 13, 2006.

After the Absolute King Rikkai feat. Rokkaku ~ Second Service show, Yanagishita did not to graduate with his fellow third cast members, and instead stayed as an alternative with the fourth generation cast. He shared the role with Yuuichirou Hirata, who was cast as the new Kaidoh, for two shows: The Progressive Match Higa Chuu feat. Rikkai and Dream Live 5th, taking turns for different performances. Yanagishita graduated from his role as Kaidoh after the last performance of the Dream Live 5th live concert. During his run of the series, he got to work with fellow D-Boys members Tetsuya Makita, Kōji Seto, and Masato Wada. He and Kujirai have both played Kaidoh the longest.

In 2020, Yanagishita got married and announced his retirement from the entertainment industry.

Filmography

Television

Movies

Stage Work
TENIMYU: THE PRINCE OF TENNIS MUSICAL SERIES (as Kaoru Kaidoh)
 The Prince of Tennis Musical: Absolute King Rikkai feat. Rokkaku ~ First Service (In Winter of 2006-2007)
 The Prince of Tennis Musical: Dream Live 4th (2007)
 The Prince of Tennis Musical: Dream Live 4th ~extra~ (2007)
 The Prince of Tennis Musical: Absolute King Rikkai feat. Rokkaku ~ Second Service (2007)
 The Prince of Tennis Musical: Progressive Match Higa feat. Rikkaidai (shared the role with Yuuichirou Hirata) (In Winter of 2007-2008)
 The Prince of Tennis Musical: Dream Live 5th (shared the role again with Hirata) (2008)

D-Boys
 2007 - D-BOYS STAGE Volume 1 as Yagishita Kiyoshi
 2008 - D-BOYS STAGE: The Last Game Volume 2 as Kanemoto Akio
 2009 - D-BOYS STAGE: Karasu Volume 3 (April Performances) as Hutoshi Hazime

Other stage work
 2007 - SWITCH WO OSUTOKI 2 ~Kimitachi wa naze ikiteirunda?~

Guest Star appearances
 2007 - Out of Order (Live Entertainment Stage Show) as Guest Star

Discography

Official DVDs
 2006 - Tenimyu - Absolute King Rikkai feat. Rokkaku ~ First Service DVD as Kaoru Kaidoh
 2007 - Tenimyu - Dream Live 4th DVD as Kaoru Kaidoh
 2007 - D-BOYS Stage Volume 1
 2007 - Renai Shindan ~Tsubasa no Kakera~ DVD (release date 21 November 2007)
 2007 - Tenimyu - Absolute King Rikkai feat. Rokkaku - Second Service DVD as Kaoru Kaidoh (release date 22 November 2007)
 2007 - Tenimyu - Supporter DVD Vol. 6 ~ Seigaku's 3rd Generation ~ (in production/release 22 December)
 2008 - D-BOYS Stage Volume 2 ~ The Last Game
 2009 - D-BOYS BOY FRIEND DVD series vol.5　TOMORROW

Official Photobooks

Special events
 2007 - Tenimyu Press conference

See also
 D-Boys
 D-Date
 Tenimyu
 The Prince of Tennis
 Kaidoh Kaoru

References

External links
Wikipedia Japanese article about 柳下大
Wikipedia Japanese article on D-Boys
Tomo Yanagishita's Blog 
Tomo Yanagishita's D-BOYS Profile 
Tomo Yanagishita's Friendster's Official Profile 
D-Boys Official Website 
Conan: The Movie
Sunadokei
Nozokiya
Renai Shindan ~Tsubasa no Kakera~
Yo ni mo Kimyo na Monogatari
Takumi-kun: Soshite, Harukaze ni Sasayaite
Akai Ito
Shinsengumi PEACE MAKER
Vampire Stories

1988 births
Living people
Japanese male actors
People from Kanagawa Prefecture